The 2003–04 NBA season was the Bucks' 36th season in the National Basketball Association. During the offseason, the Bucks acquired Joe Smith from the Minnesota Timberwolves. Under new head coach Terry Porter, the Bucks played around .500 for most of the first half of the season. At midseason, the team traded Tim Thomas to the New York Knicks for Keith Van Horn. The young Bucks managed to play well as Michael Redd, who continued to show improvement had a breakout season averaging 21.7 points per game, while being selected for the 2004 NBA All-Star Game. However, after holding a 33–27 record as of March 3, the Bucks lost eight of their next nine games, but still managed to make the playoffs despite finishing fourth in the Central Division with a 41–41 record. Top draft pick T.J. Ford made the All-Second Rookie Team. However, the Bucks did not make it out of the first round once again, losing to the eventual champions, the Detroit Pistons, in five games.

Draft picks

Roster

Roster Notes
 Center Daniel Santiago played for the Puerto Rican national team, but he also holds American citizenship.

Regular season

Season standings

z - clinched division title
y - clinched division title
x - clinched playoff spot

Record vs. opponents

Game log

Playoffs

|- align="center" bgcolor="#ffcccc"
| 1
| April 18
| @ Detroit
| L 82–108
| Desmond Mason (16)
| Joe Smith (11)
| Damon Jones (7)
| The Palace of Auburn Hills22,076
| 0–1
|- align="center" bgcolor="#ccffcc"
| 2
| April 21
| @ Detroit
| W 92–88
| Michael Redd (26)
| Joe Smith (13)
| Damon Jones (7)
| The Palace of Auburn Hills22,076
| 1–1
|- align="center" bgcolor="#ffcccc"
| 3
| April 24
| Detroit
| L 85–95
| Mason, Redd (19)
| Desmond Mason (9)
| Damon Jones (7)
| Bradley Center18,717
| 1–2
|- align="center" bgcolor="#ffcccc"
| 4
| April 26
| Detroit
| L 92–109
| Smith, Jones (17)
| Joe Smith (12)
| Damon Jones (10)
| Bradley Center17,316
| 1–3
|- align="center" bgcolor="#ffcccc"
| 5
| April 29
| @ Detroit
| L 77–91
| Michael Redd (22)
| Keith Van Horn (12)
| Damon Jones (6)
| The Palace of Auburn Hills22,076
| 1–4
|-

Player statistics
Source:

Season

Playoffs

Awards and records

Transactions

Trades

Free agents

References

See also
 2003-04 NBA season

Milwaukee Bucks seasons
Milwaukee Bucks
Milwaukee Bucks
Milwaukee